We Need to Do Something is a 2021 American psychological horror film directed by Sean King O'Grady and starring Sierra McCormick, Vinessa Shaw, Lisette Alexis, Pat Healy, and Ozzy Osbourne. Based on the novella of the same name, the film centers on a family trapped in their bathroom during a tornado. The film was shot during the COVID-19 pandemic and is the first film production from Spin a Black Yarn Productions, with its co-founders Josh Malerman and Ryan Lewis serving as producers.

We Need to Do Something had its world premiere at the Tribeca Film Festival in June 2021, and was theatrically released by IFC Films on September 3, 2021. The film polarized critics upon release, who praised the film's characters, use of jump-scares, and McCormick's performance, however criticized its failure to "capture the actual psychological awfulness of being trapped too near your nearest and dearest, with no end in sight".

Premise
Following a tornado, Melissa, a young teenager, finds herself trapped in a bathroom with her family.

Cast 
 Sierra McCormick as Melissa
 Vinessa Shaw as Diane
 Pat Healy as Robert
 John James Cronin as Bobby
 Lisette Alexis as Amy
 Ozzy Osbourne as the voice of Good Boy
 Logan Kearney as Joe

Production
The film is based on a novella of the same name written by Max Booth III, who adapted his own work into a screenplay; the success of Booth's 2020 novel Touch the Night, published by Cemetery Dance, helped draw attention to the project. Although the novella and screenplay were completed prior to the COVID-19 outbreak, director Sean King O'Grady found resonance in the story with America's response to the pandemic, saying "Without directly addressing the nightmare we are currently living through, Max created a hellish allegory that still manages to capture the collective trauma we’re all experiencing."

The film was shot entirely on a soundstage in Michigan owned by production company Atlas Industries over the course of four weeks between September and October 2020; production took place in secret, with no announcements about cast or crew until filming had already wrapped. Owing to the ongoing COVID-19 pandemic, extra precautions had to be taken, including a minimal number of crewmembers.

Reception

Critical response 
On review aggregator Rotten Tomatoes, the film holds an approval rating of 56% based on 59 reviews, with an average rating of 6.2/10. The website's critics consensus reads: "While We Need to Do Something can feel as unfocused as its title, it offers eerily timely genre chills, soaked in claustrophobic dread."

Meagan Navarro of Bloody Disgusting gave the film a score of 2.5/5, writing that it "asks its audience to use their imagination for much of the horrors that barrage its characters, as its story is told solely within the confines of a single room", but stated that it "isn't interested in offering any definitive answers, only suggesting mere possibilities." Jessica Kiang of Variety said that the film "fails to capture the actual psychological awfulness of being trapped to near your nearest and dearest, with no end in sight", and added: "When, late in the film, a phone's "Never Gonna Give You Up" ringtone sounds out, it's hard to escape the suspicion we've been Rickrolled."

Amidst the mixed reception, McCormick's performance was lauded, with some critics deeming it a highlight of the film. Weekly magazine Chicago Reader described the actress as "captivating", and IGN praised her take on the character, stating that she "brings wide eyes and a sulking snarl to teen daughter Melissa, whose internal drama is signaled by a goth wardrobe topped by a bubblegum pink wig."

References

External links
 

2021 films
2021 horror films
American psychological horror films
Films based on American horror novels
Films impacted by the COVID-19 pandemic
2020s American films